Argyropelecus is an oceanic  ray-finned fish genus in the deep sea hatchetfish family Sternoptychidae. A collective name is "silver hatchetfishes", but this can also refer to a species of the freshwater hatchetfishes which are not particularly closely related to this. The large pupils of these marine hatchetfishes enable them to see dim objects in the deep sea, where light barely penetrates.

Species 
There are currently seven recognized extant species in this genus:
 Argyropelecus aculeatus Valenciennes, 1850 (lovely hatchetfish, Atlantic silver hatchetfish)
 Argyropelecus affinis Garman, 1899 (Pacific hatchetfish)
 Argyropelecus gigas Norman, 1930 (giant hatchetfish, greater silver hatchetfish)
 Argyropelecus hemigymnus Cocco, 1829 (half-naked hatchetfish, short silver hatchetfish, spurred hatchetfish)
 Argyropelecus lychnus Garman, 1899 (tropical hatchetfish)
 Argyropelecus olfersii (G. Cuvier, 1829)
 Argyropelecus sladeni Regan, 1908 (Sladen's hatchetfish, silvery hatchetfish)

The earliest unequivocal fossils of Argyropelecus date from the start of the Chattian stage of the Late Oligocene  The original assessment of Eocene-aged otoliths from Austria assigned to this genus is now questioned.

References

External links

 Information about Argyropelecus aculeatus

Sternoptychidae
Extant Chattian first appearances
Marine fish genera
Ray-finned fish genera
Taxa named by Anastasio Cocco